Kovacik is a surname. Notable people with the surname include: 

Karen Kovacik,  American poet laureate
Robert Kovacik, American television journalist

Kováčik
Kováčik (feminine: Kováčiková) is a Slovak surname. It is a diminutive form of Kováč/Kováčová. The surname may refer to:

 Ján Kováčik, president of Slovak Football Association
 Jozef Kováčik (born 1980), Slovak ice hockey player

See also
 Kováčik, surname
 Kovačec, surname
 Kovaček, surname
 Kovačev, surname
 Kovačevik, surname
 Kovačević, surname
 Kovačevski, surname
 Kovačić (surname)
 Kovačina (surname)
 Kovač (surname)

English-language surnames